Hemilienardia malleti is a species of sea snail, a marine gastropod mollusk in the family Raphitomidae.

Description
The length of the shell varies between 4 mm and  5 mm.

The shell is rose-red with a median white band. The inner margin of the aperture shows 5-6 closely set teeth.

Distribution
This marine species occurs in the Western Pacific and off Taiwan.

References

 Récluz, C., 1852. Description de coquilles nouvelles. Journal de Conchyliologie 3: 249-259
 Vine, P. (1986). Red Sea Invertebrates. Immel Publishing, London. 224 pp.
 Fischer-Piette, E., 1950. Listes des types décrits dans le Journal de Conchyliologie et conservés dans la collection de ce journal. Journal de Conchyliologie 90: 8-23

External links
 
 MNHN, Paris: syntype
 Gastropods.com: Hemilienardia malleti

malleti
Gastropods described in 1852